Karl Bruns is a retired slalom canoeist who competed for West Germany in the mid-1950s. He won a bronze medal in the folding K-1 team event at the 1953 ICF Canoe Slalom World Championships in Meran.

References

External links 
 Karl BRUNS at CanoeSlalom.net

German male canoeists
Possibly living people
Year of birth missing
Medalists at the ICF Canoe Slalom World Championships